Sloane is a 1985 action film starring Robert Resnik as "Philip Sloane,"  a martial arts instructor who fights kidnappers and cannibal pygmies in the Philippines.  It also stars Debra Blee.

External links

1984 films
1984 action films
American action films
American martial arts films
1980s English-language films
1980s American films